The French Karate Federation (Fédération Française de Karaté) is the largest association for karate in France and a member as well as the official representative for this sport in the French National Olympic and Sports Committee.

International competition

French Karate Federation is a member of the European umbrella organization European Karate Federation as well as the World Association for World Karate Federation (WKF).

On the part of the France Olympic Committee, the French Karate Federation is the only Karate Association authorized to send athletes to the Olympic Games.

References

Karate in France
Karate organizations
Karate